The 1935 Nebraska Cornhuskers football team was an American football team that represented the University of Nebraska in the Big Six Conference during the 1935 college football season. In its seventh season under head coach Dana X. Bible, the team compiled a 6–2–1 record (4–0–1 against conference opponents), won the Big Six championship, and outscored opponents by a total of 138 to 71. The team played its home games at Memorial Stadium in Lincoln, Nebraska.

Before the season
Coach Bible became the longest Nebraska head football coach in program history to date when he began his seventh season with the Cornhuskers.  The 1934 squad had been made almost entirely of new starters who proved themselves by dropping only three games, two of which were to the teams that would end the season nationally ranked #1 and #2, and finishing second in the Big 6.  Almost all of them were back, experienced, and ready to try to put Nebraska back on top.

Schedule

Roster

Coaching staff

Game summaries

Chicago

Chicago journeyed to Lincoln to repay a visit made by Nebraska to Chicago's home field back in 1905, which ended as a 5-38 defeat handed down by the Maroons, one of only two losses suffered by the 1905 Cornhuskers.  This time around, the debt was repaid in full as Nebraska's line appeared to already be in mid-season form and the Chicago team was handily defeated in the Nebraska opening game.  The teams never met again, and the record therefore remained evenly divided between them at 1-1-0.

Iowa State

Iowa State hosted Nebraska to open conference play, and the visiting Cornhuskers had little difficulty starting their Big 6 schedule on the right foot with yet another win against the Cyclones.  Iowa State, now having dropped 13 straight to Nebraska, was quickly falling out of sight in their series deficit, at 4-25-1.

Minnesota

The reigning national championship Minnesota Golden Gophers team arrived in Lincoln in a heralded high-interest game that was broadcast nationally on two radio networks.  The stadium full of fans was bound for disappointment, however, as Nebraska fell by just five points.  Minnesota, along with Pittsburgh, just seemed to always have Nebraska's number, and improved over the Cornhuskers to 13-2-2.  The Gophers went on to finish the season undefeated at 8-0-0 and ranked #2 nationally by the Dickinson System, while the United Press International's first ever end-of-season poll ranked Minnesota at #1.

Kansas State

A bit of a hangover from the emotional defeat at the hands of Minnesota the week before seemed to bog down the Cornhuskers when they visited Kansas State to avenge being denied the 1934 Big 6 title.  Instead, while Nebraska succeeded in holding the Wildcats without a score, Nebraska also failed to ever get the ball across the line or between the uprights themselves, handing both teams a scoreless tie.  The record held steady, well in Nebraska's favor, at 16-2-2.

Oklahoma

Coach Bible succeeded in shaking off the doldrums that slowed his Cornhuskers in Manhattan, and led Nebraska to a convincing shutout victory over the visiting Oklahoma Sooners, where it seemed that all functions of the Cornhusker machine were once again working as expected.  Nebraska's winning streak over Oklahoma was now at five, and they remained in command of the series at 11-2-2.

Missouri

Although the Tigers scored first, it was another year of frustration for Missouri, as Nebraska defeated the Tigers for the fifth time in a row (and stayed undefeated against them for eight straight), once again retaining custody of the Missouri-Nebraska Bell that the Tigers had possessed for only the duration of one game to date (literally from when it was awarded prior to the Missouri-Nebraska kickoff in 1928 until Nebraska won that game).  Nebraska's command over Missouri was now up to 20-6-3.

Kansas

Kansas gave Nebraska some tense moments in front of the homecoming crowd, scoring first and trailing just 7-12 at the half.  The Jayhawks pulled ahead again by one point to keep the pressure on, though the Cornhuskers managed to answer again and hold before time expired.  This was the 12th straight win over Kansas, and the 31-9-2 advantage held by Nebraska was the largest against all opponents at that time.  The win closed out Nebraska's 1935 Big 6 schedule with no losses, clinching the league title.

Pittsburgh

A closely matched, hard-fought defensive battle yielded only one score on the day, which belonged to the home team Panthers.  Nebraska suffered yet another loss to rival Pittsburgh, their 3rd in a row and 10th straight without a victory.  Pittsburgh went on to finish the season 7-1-2 and ranked #10 nationally in the United Press International's first ever end-of-season poll.

Oregon State

Oregon State provided the last win for the 1935 Cornhuskers, in a game that featured big plays again and again.  Midway through the third quarter, the Beavers were holding the lead with Nebraska reserves on the field.  Coach Bible put the starters back in, and they summarily marched 65 yards in 13 plays to put up the game-winning points.  Nebraska remained perfect against Oregon State all-time in the four meetings of these teams.

After the season
Coach Bible brought home another Big 6 championship to add to his sizable collection, Nebraska's sixth over the last eight seasons.  The United Press International released their first-ever end-of-season national poll, for just this year, which showed the Cornhuskers finishing at #21.  Coach Bible's career record at Nebraska improved to 43-13-7 (.738), and he brought the Cornhusker program total to 263-87-27 (.733) while advancing the league record to what had become a commanding dominance of 82-11-9 (.848).

Awards

References

Nebraska
Nebraska Cornhuskers football seasons
Big Eight Conference football champion seasons
Nebraska Cornhuskers football